At the End of the World is a 1921 American silent action drama film produced by Famous Players-Lasky and distributed by Paramount Pictures.

Cast

Betty Compson as Cherry O'Day
Milton Sills as Gordon Deane
Mitchell Lewis as Donald MacGregor
Casson Ferguson as Harvey Gates
Spottiswoode Aitken as Terence O'Day
Joseph Kilgour as William Blaine
Goro Kino as Uang

Preservation
A copy of At the End of the World is held at the Gosfilmofond Russian State Archive.

References

External links

Lantern slide at silenthollywood.com

1921 films
American silent feature films
American films based on plays
Paramount Pictures films
American romantic drama films
1921 romantic drama films
American black-and-white films
Films based on Austrian novels
Films directed by Penrhyn Stanlaws
1920s American films
Silent romantic drama films
Silent American drama films